Soorpanagai is an upcoming Indian historical mystery film written and directed by Caarthick Raju. It is shot simultaneously in Tamil and Telugu languages, the latter titled Nene Naa..?!. The film's Tamil title is  derived from the epic Ramayana's popular character Soorpanagai, sister of the Tamil king Ravana. The plot of the film set in two time periods, modern and 1920s have Regina Cassandra playing an archaeologist in current time and Akshara Gowda portraying a girl belonging to landowners family of past.

Synopsis
The film is set in two periods, current and 1920s. In modern times an archaeologist, who as part of her job, unearths something antique which leads to mysterious events.

Cast 
 Regina Cassandra
 Akshara Gowda
 Jayaprakash
 Mansoor Ali Khan (Tamil)
 Vennela Kishore (Telugu)
 Jeeva Ravi 
 Michael 
 Kaushik
 Yogi
 Ravi Raja
 K. Sivasankar

Production
Set in two time periods the film has cast of Regina Cassandra and Akshara Gowda. In the current period Regina plays role of an archaeologist while in the period of 1920s, Akshara plays a member of land owners family. The film is shot simultaneously in Tamil and Telugu languages has been titled Soorpanagai in Tamil, and in Telugu it is called Nene Naa..?!. Principal photography began in early March 2020 in a Tamil village Courtallam. The filming resumed on 5 January 2021 after lockdown due to COVID-19 pandemic, and was wrapped up in August 2021.

References

External links
 

Upcoming Tamil-language films
Indian multilingual films
Films set in the 1920s
Films shot in Tamil Nadu
Film productions suspended due to the COVID-19 pandemic
Upcoming Telugu-language films
Films scored by Sam C. S.

Films directed by Caarthick Raju